Justice Flaherty may refer to:

Francis Flaherty (judge) (born 1947), associate justice of the Rhode Island Supreme Court
John P. Flaherty Jr. (1931–2019), associate justice of the Supreme Court of Pennsylvania